Cryptocephalus amatus is a species of case-bearing leaf beetle in the family Chrysomelidae. It is found in North America.

Subspecies
Three subspecies belong to the species Cryptocephalus amatus:
 Cryptocephalus amatus amatus Haldeman, 1849 i c g
 Cryptocephalus amatus apicedens Fall, 1932 i c g
 Cryptocephalus amatus fractilineatus R. White, 1968 i c g
Data sources: i = ITIS, c = Catalogue of Life, g = GBIF, b = Bugguide.net

References

Further reading

 
 
 

amatus
Articles created by Qbugbot
Beetles described in 1849
Taxa named by Samuel Stehman Haldeman